Anthony Arthur may refer to:

 Anthony Arthur (author) (1937–2009), American author
 Anthony Arthur (weightlifter) (born 1973), British weightlifter